Stefano Marchetti is an Italian professional ice hockey defenceman who participated at the 2010 IIHF World Championship as a member of the Italian National men's ice hockey team.

References

Living people
Italian ice hockey defencemen
1986 births
Sportspeople from Trento